is a Chinese manhua published by Tencent authored and illustrated by Li Xiaonan. A Chinese/Japanese co-produced anime adaptation premiered in 2017.

Plot
Young men and women are experiencing "net addiction", a condition which manifests as a series of negative emotions and which in turn causes them to withdraw further into the Internet and electronic devices. 17-year-old Hibiki has been involuntarily enrolled in a rehabilitation facility called the Elite Reeducation Academy, but the place is little more than a strict prison for Hibiki and others like him.

Characters

Shiori is Hibiki's love interest.

Anime
The series started airing on Tokyo MX on October 10, 2017, for a total of 12 episodes, ending its broadcast on January 2, 2018. It is currently available for streaming on Crunchyroll. The series was directed and written by Dong Yi, produced by Tang Yunkang, and had music composed by Manels Favre and Max Huang. Liang Yuan served as character designer, and Zhao Xie was the animation director.

References

External links
 
 

2010s prison television series
2017 anime television series debuts
2015 webcomic debuts
2017 Chinese television series debuts
Chinese animated television series
Chinese webcomics
Crunchyroll anime
Drama anime and manga
Haoliners Animation League
Manhua adapted into television series
Manhua titles
Prison television series
Tencent manhua
Television shows based on manhua
Television shows based on webcomics
Tokyo MX original programming
Works about school violence